Amblyptilia galactostacta is a moth of the family Pterophoridae. It is known from New Guinea.

References

External links
Papua Insects

Amblyptilia
Moths described in 1952
Endemic fauna of Papua New Guinea